PowerHUB refers to the name of a series of Integrated Circuits (ICs) developed by ST-Ericsson, a 50/50 joint venture of Ericsson and STMicroelectronics established on February 3, 2009.

These ICs are designed for the energy management and the battery charging of mobile devices.

The first member of the PowerHUB family, the PM2300,  has been announced by ST-Ericsson on February 9, 2011.

On February 28, 2012, ST-Ericsson introduced a new IC in this family, the PM2020, supporting the wireless charging technology standardized by the Wireless Power Consortium (WPC).

References

Integrated circuits